Sin City Rules is an American reality television series that debuted December 9, 2012, on TLC. It chronicles the day-to-day lives of five women who reside in Las Vegas, Nevada. Sin City Rules was cancelled due to low viewership, with the last three episodes uploaded to the series website.

Cast

Main cast
 Lana Fuchs is the owner of a high-end clothing line, concierge service, along with a record label. Fuchs has been married for twenty years.
 Amy Hanley who was born and raised in Las Vegas is an entrepreneur and is the daughter of the deceased Tom Hanley, and author Wendy Mazaros.
 Jennifer Harman is a professional poker player.
 Alicia Jacobs is a former beauty pageant queen and is currently an independent entertainment business reporter.
 Lori Montoya is the owner of a cosmetic line. Montoya and her husband are in the process of opening up the world's first indoor trap range named the Presidential Club .

Supporting Cast
Kimberly Friedmutter

Series overview

Episodes

References

2010s American reality television series
2012 American television series debuts
2013 American television series endings
English-language television shows
TLC (TV network) original programming
Television shows set in the Las Vegas Valley